Alaska was possibly a populated place in Northumberland County, Pennsylvania, United States. There was a coal mine at the site in the 1890s.

See also
Kulpmont, Pennsylvania
Locust Gap, Pennsylvania
Merrian, Pennsylvania
Mount Carmel, Pennsylvania

References

Geography of Northumberland County, Pennsylvania